South Korea's far-right party, the Our Republican Party, has been founded twice historically.

 Our Republican Party (2017)
 Our Republican Party (2020)